Christopher Paul Jans (born April 12, 1969) is the American college basketball head coach for Mississippi State. Jans previously coached at New Mexico State, where he led the Aggies from 2017 to 2022. Jans is a graduate of Loras College, and hails from Fairbank, Iowa.

Prior to New Mexico State, Jans was hired by Bowling Green in March 2014—his first Division I job.  He led Bowling Green to its most wins in 13 years. However, on March 21—shortly after losing to Canisius in the 2nd round of the 2015 CollegeInsider.com Postseason Tournament, a drunken Jans was seen engaging in lewd and inappropriate behavior toward women at a bar near campus.  A Bowling Green alumnus recorded Jans on his cell phone, and was so outraged by what he saw that he reported the incident to school officials. Following an internal investigation, Bowling Green fired Jans for violating a morals clause in his contract.

Jans led New Mexico State to a 27-7 record in 2021-22, including an NCAA Tournament victory. He finished with a 122-32 mark at New Mexico State, winning four regular-season and three Western Athletic Conference tournament championships. On March 20, 2022, Jans was hired as head coach at Mississippi State.

Head coaching record

Junior college

College

source

Personal life

Jans resides in Starkville with his wife Sheri.

References

1969 births
Living people
American men's basketball coaches
American men's basketball players
Basketball coaches from Iowa
Basketball players from Iowa
Bowling Green Falcons men's basketball coaches
College men's basketball head coaches in the United States
Elmhurst Bluejays men's basketball coaches
Grand View Vikings men's basketball coaches
Idaho Vandals men's basketball coaches
Illinois State Redbirds men's basketball coaches
Independence Pirates men's basketball coaches
Loras Duhawks men's basketball players
Mississippi State Bulldogs men's basketball coaches
New Mexico State Aggies men's basketball coaches
Wichita State Shockers men's basketball coaches